(born March 12, 1970) is a former Japanese cross-country skier who competed from 1992 to 2005. Competing in four Winter Olympics, he earned his best career finish of sixth in the 50 km event at Salt Lake City in 2002.

Imai's best finish at the FIS Nordic World Ski Championships was ninth in the 50 km event at Val di Fiemme in 2003. His best World Cup finish was ninth in a 30 km event in Austria in 2001.

Imai earned six individual career victories in lesser events up to 30 km from 1996 to 2005.

External links
 
 Olympic 4 x 10 km relay results: 1936–2002 

1970 births
Living people
Japanese male cross-country skiers
Olympic cross-country skiers of Japan
Cross-country skiers at the 1992 Winter Olympics
Cross-country skiers at the 1994 Winter Olympics
Cross-country skiers at the 1998 Winter Olympics
Cross-country skiers at the 2002 Winter Olympics
Asian Games medalists in cross-country skiing
Cross-country skiers at the 1990 Asian Winter Games
Cross-country skiers at the 1999 Asian Winter Games
Cross-country skiers at the 2003 Asian Winter Games
Medalists at the 1990 Asian Winter Games
Medalists at the 1999 Asian Winter Games
Asian Games silver medalists for Japan
Asian Games bronze medalists for Japan
Universiade medalists in cross-country skiing
Universiade silver medalists for Japan
Competitors at the 1991 Winter Universiade
20th-century Japanese people